Dewberry is a hamlet in central Alberta, Canada within the County of Vermilion River. The hamlet was named for the dewberries growing near the community. Its first school opened in 1930. Dewberry held village status prior to 2021.

History 
Dewberry incorporated as a village on January 1, 1957. It relinquished its village status on January 1, 2021, when it dissolved to become a hamlet under the jurisdiction of the County of Vermilion River.

Demographics 
In the 2016 Census of Population conducted by Statistics Canada, Dewberry recorded a population of 186 living in 90 of its 104 total private dwellings, a  change from its 2011 population of 201.

In the 2011 Census, Dewberry had a population of 201 living in 87 of its 106 total dwellings, a 2.6% change from its 2006 population of 196.

The population of Dewberry, according to its 2010 municipal census is 219, a 5.2% decrease from its 2008 municipal census population of 231.

Notable people 

 Kurt Bensmiller - World champion chuckwagon driver

See also 
List of communities in Alberta
List of hamlets in Alberta

References

External links 

1957 establishments in Alberta
2021 disestablishments in Alberta
Hamlets in Alberta